Philippe Cimadomo (born 5 December 1959) is a French businessman and racing driver currently competing in the European Le Mans Series with TDS Racing x Vaillante. He is notable for being excluded from competing at the 2022 24 Hours of Le Mans after being involved in a number of incidents during practice.

Cimadomo was the CEO of French software company , which he co-founded in 1980.

Racing record

Racing career summary 

† As Cimadomo was a guest driver, he was ineligible to score points.
* Season still in progress.

Complete European Le Mans Series results 
(key) (Races in bold indicate pole position; results in italics indicate fastest lap)

References

External links 

 

1959 births
Living people
French racing drivers
European Le Mans Series drivers
TDS Racing drivers
Graff Racing drivers
24H Series drivers
Le Mans Cup drivers